The 22nd European Women's Artistic Gymnastics Championships were held from 30 April to 3 May 1998 in Saint Petersburg, Russia.

Medalists

Medal table

Combined

Seniors

Juniors

Seniors

Team

All-around

Vault

Uneven bars

Balance beam

Floor exercise

Juniors

Team

All-around

Vault

Uneven bars

Balance beam

Floor exercise

References 

1998
European Artistic Gymnastics Championships
1998 in European sport
International gymnastics competitions hosted by Russia
1998 in Russian women's sport